Trouble in Angel City is the second and final studio album released by Heavy metal band Lion.

Track listing

Personnel 
Lion
 Kal Swan – lead vocals
 Doug Aldrich – guitars, backing vocals
 Jerry Best – bass, backing vocals
 Mark Edwards – drums, backing vocals

Additional musicians
 Rick Seratte – keyboards, programming, backing vocals
 Scott MacLachlan – backing vocals
 Victoria Seeger – female vocals

Production 
 Lion – producers
 Alan Isaacs – engineer, mixing 
 Greg Fulginiti – mastering at Artisan Sound Recorders (North Hollywood, California)
 Kal Swan – logo design, cover concept
 Emily Keifer at Jupiter Design – artwork 
 Anna Maria DeSanto – front cover photography 
 Toshimasa Matano – back cover photography

Album information 
The original album was released in Japan as an import.
"Love Is a Lie", "Victims of Circumstance", "Stranger in the City", "Hungry for Love", and "Forgotten Sons" were originally recorded for the Powerlove EP, released in 1986 in Japan only.
An earlier version of "Love Is a Lie" was used in the 1984 horror film Friday the 13th: The Final Chapter during Crispin Glover's infamous dance sequence for his character Jimmy.

1989 albums
Lion (band) albums